Know Better Learn Faster is the second studio album by alternative folk band Thao & The Get Down Stay Down. It was released on October 13, 2009 on the Kill Rock Stars label.

Background 
"The record is primarily a response to the end of a relationship, so a lot of it is pretty reactionary. It’s trying to be introspective, but there’s always got to be a little 'fuck you' in there – or, sometimes there’s a lot."

Title 
Thao Nguyen explained the title of the album in an interview with KEXP: “The album is named ‘Know Better Learn Faster’ because you can't. By the time you realize you should, it's too late. And I enjoy the predicament and the totally devastating, unfunny humor of that.”

Track listing

References

External links
 Thao Nguyen official website

2009 albums

Thao & the Get Down Stay Down albums
Kill Rock Stars albums
Albums produced by Tucker Martine